Dentimargo tropicensis is a species of sea snail, a marine gastropod mollusk in the family Marginellidae, the margin snails.

Description

Distribution
This marine species was found on the Norfolk Ridge.

References

Marginellidae
Gastropods described in 2002